Parliamentary elections to elect all 151 members of the Croatian Parliament were held on 23 November 2003. They were the fifth parliamentary elections to take place since the first multi-party elections in 1990. Voter turnout was 61.7%. The result was a victory for the opposition Croatian Democratic Union (HDZ) which won a plurality of 66 seats, but fell short of the 76 needed to form a government. HDZ chairman Ivo Sanader was named the eighth Prime Minister of Croatia on 23 December 2003, after parliament passed a confidence motion in his government cabinet, with 88 MPs voting in favor, 29 against and 14 abstaining. The ruling coalition going into the elections, consisting of the Social Democratic Party (SDP), Croatian People's Party (HNS), Croatian Peasant Party (HSS), Party of Liberal Democrats (Libra) and the Liberal Party (LS), did not contest the elections as a single bloc; the SDP ran with the Istrian Democratic Assembly (IDS), the Party of Liberal Democrats (Libra) and the Liberal Party, HNS ran with the Alliance of Primorje-Gorski Kotar (PGS) and the Slavonia-Baranja Croatian Party (SBHS), while HSS ran on its own.

General information

There are 10 electoral units based on geography and population. In each unit, 14 candidates are elected on proportional electoral system. The election threshold is 5%.

In addition, 8 candidates are elected to represent national minorities.

The citizens that live outside Croatian borders vote in a separate electoral unit. The number of representatives elected from this unit will be determined after the elections, based on how many people actually vote in Croatia, so that there is equal value of votes both inside and outside Croatia.
For reference, the number of diaspora seats in the 2000-2003 Sabor was six.

Total: 140 domestic seats + 8 minority seats + 4 diaspora seats.

Distribution of minority seats:
 Serbs: 3
 Hungarians: 1
 Italians: 1
 Czechs and Slovaks: 1
 Austrians, Bulgarians, Germans, Poles, Romani, Romanians, Rusyns, Russians, Turks, Ukrainians, Vlachs and Jews: 1
 Albanians, Bosniaks, Montenegrins, Macedonians, Slovenes: 1

Parties and coalitions
Pre-election coalitions:
 DC and HSLS, in all electoral units
 SDP and IDS, in the 8th electoral unit (the county of Istria et al.)
 HB and HIP, in all electoral units
 SDP and Libra in the 2nd, 3rd, 4th and 10th electoral unit
 SDP and LS, in the 4th and 6th electoral unit
 HNS and SBHS, in the 4th and 5th electoral unit (counties of Slavonia)
 HNS and PGS, in the 7th and 8th electoral unit (Northern seacoast counties)

Opinion polls

Results
The number of diaspora mandates was reduced by two compared to previous elections due to somewhat lower diaspora turnout. Due to distribution according to the d'Hondt method, the independent lists for diaspora were not allocated seats even if they received more than 5% of the total votes.

Minority seats
National minorities elected 8 representatives through a separate election system: Vojislav Stanimirović (22,2% of votes), Milorad Pupovac (21,7%) and Ratko Gajica (13,8%) for the Serb national minority, Jene Adam (42%) for the Hungarian minority, Furio Radin (79,8%) for the Italian minority, Zdenka Čuhnil (39,2%) for the Czech and Slovak minorities, Nikola Mak (14,3%) for the Austrian, Bulgarian, German, Jewish, Polish, Roma, Romanian, Rusyn, Russian, Turkish, Ukrainian, Vlach minorities and Šemso Tanković (59,1%) for the Albanian, Bosniak, Macedonian, Montenegrin and Slovene minorities.

Aftermath
Ivo Sanader of the Croatian Democratic Union was appointed as Prime Minister by the President and confirmed by the Croatian Parliament.

The new government was formed of 13 HDZ ministers and one from the Democratic Centre.

See also
Politics of Croatia

References

External links
 Official election archive by the State Election Committee

Elections in Croatia
2003 elections in Europe
2003 in Croatia
November 2003 events in Europe
2003 elections in Croatia